White Lake State Park is a  public recreation area in Tamworth, New Hampshire. The state park surrounds  White Lake, a typical glacial lake. It is open year-round and offers swimming, hiking, non-motorized boating, picnicking, trout fishing, winter sports, day-use area, group areas, and seasonal camping.

The park's  stand of pitch pine trees was designated a National Natural Landmark in 1980. It is accessible by a walking trail that also passes a series of kettle bogs.

References

External links
White Lake State Park New Hampshire Department of Natural and Cultural Resources

State parks of New Hampshire
Parks in Carroll County, New Hampshire
Protected areas established in 1933
1933 establishments in New Hampshire
Tamworth, New Hampshire
National Natural Landmarks in New Hampshire
1980 establishments in New Hampshire